Hadrut is a town in the Khojavend District of Azerbaijan, in the disputed region of Nagorno-Karabakh.

The town had an ethnic Armenian-majority population prior to the 2020 Nagorno-Karabakh war. Numerous Armenian civilians were killed in and around Hadrut by Azerbaijani forces during or after the battle. Subsequently, Azerbaijani soldiers vandalized Armenian-owned property, including the local church and cemetery, obliterating its gravestones.

Toponymy 
The name Hadrut is of Persian origin, and means "between two rivers". This is explained by the fact that the older part of the settlement was located between two streams, Guney-chay and Guzey-chay. Hadrut later expanded beyond the two rivers to the east and west.

The town is also infrequently called Getahat by Armenians. In Azerbaijan, the town is also called Aghoghlan.

History 

The date of Hadrut's foundation is unknown. Fragments of monuments and historical artifacts dated to pre-Christian, early Christian and medieval times have been found in and around Hadrut. There are several ruins of ancient fortresses and walls in the valley surrounding Hadrut. From medieval times until the early 19th century, Hadrut was a part of the Armenian Principality of Dizak, one of the five Melikdoms of Karabakh. In the 15th and 16th century, many of the fortifications, churches and settlements around Hadrut were destroyed by Ottoman and Safavid forces as they fought for control of the South Caucasus. A small number of these structures were rebuilt under the rule of the meliks of Dizak. The Melikdom of Dizak was subordinated to the Karabakh Khanate before the Russian conquest of Karabakh.

During the Russian period, Hadrut was governed as part of different administrative divisions: first as a part of Karabakh Province (1822–1840), then in the Shusha uezd of the Caspian Oblast (1840–1846), then in the Shusha uezd of the Shemakha Governorate (1846–1859), then of the Shusha uezd of the Baku Governorate (1859–1868), and finally, of the Shusha uezd of the Elizavetpol Governorate (1868–1873) and later the Jebrail uezd of the Elizavetpol Governorate (1873–1917) successively.

In the Soviet period, Hadrut became the centre of the Hadrut District of the Nagorno-Karabakh Autonomous Oblast within Azerbaijan SSR and was given the urban settlement status in 1963. Some of the earliest activities of the Karabakh movement occurred in Hadrut, beginning with the collection of petitions in 1986 for the transfer of the Nagorno-Karabakh Autonomous Oblast to the Armenian SSR and culminating in a demonstration of one thousand people in Hadrut in February 1988, which then spread to the capital of the NKAO, Stepanakert. Following the Armenian victory in the First Nagorno-Karabakh War, Hadrut became the administrative center of the Hadrut Province of the Republic of Artsakh.

In the midst of the 2020 Nagorno-Karabakh conflict, heavy fighting took place in Hadrut, marked by the usage of cluster munitions by the Azerbaijani Army. Azerbaijan captured Hadrut on or around 9 October 2020. Although most of the civilian population was evacuated, Armenian authorities reported that a number of civilians were killed by Azerbaijani forces in Hadrut and the surrounding area during or after the battle. Following the battle, a video of an execution of two unarmed and bound Armenian men in the town by Azerbaijani soldiers spread online, prompting investigations.

The town was vandalized and looted by Azerbaijani soldiers after its capture, with people's belongings strewn throughout the streets and the contents of homes upturned. The Armenian cemetery of the town's church was vandalized as well, with its gravestones having been kicked down and smashed. In January 2021, as part of the reconstruction work in Hadrut, new Azerbaijani-language street signs were erected in Hadrut with new street names based on the names of fallen Azerbaijani soldiers and historical Azerbaijani personalities. In June 2021, Azerbaijani authorities installed an "Iron Fist" monument in the town to celebrate the outcome of the 2020 war.

Historical heritage sites 
Historical heritage sites in and around the town include the 14th-century church of Spitak Khach located on a hill to the south of Hadrut, on the road towards the neighboring village of Vank, the 13th-century bridge of Tsiltakhach, the Holy Resurrection Church built in 1621, a cemetery from between the 17th and 19th centuries, as well as a 19th-century bridge, watermill and oil mill.

Economy 
The town was home to the Mika-Hadrut Winery, which produced brandy, vodka, and wine.

Demographics 
According to the 1910 publication of Kavkazskiy kalendar, Hadrut—then known as Gadrud—had a mostly Armenian population of 2,700 in 1908.

The earliest recorded census of the town of Hadrut showed a population of around 2,400 registered inhabitants in 1939, of which more than 90% was Armenian. Hadrut kept an Armenian-majority population throughout the First Nagorno-Karabakh War, up until the 2020 Nagorno-Karabakh war, during which the town was captured by Azerbaijani forces and the Armenian population was expelled.

Gallery

Climate 
Hadrut has a cold semi-arid climate (BSk) according to the Köppen climate classification.

International relations 
When the town was under Armenian control, Hadrut was twinned with the following cities:
 Vagarshapat, Armenia (2010–2020)
 Burbank, United States (2014–2020)

References

External links 

 

Populated places in Hadrut Province
Populated places in Khojavend District
Nagorno-Karabakh
Former Armenian inhabited settlements